Santo Stefano is a Paleo-Christian, Roman Catholic basilica church in central Verona, region of Veneto, Italy.

History
A church at this site, built on an Isis dedicated Roman temple, was consecrated in 421, and for four centuries was the burial site for the bishops of Verona. For a time, this served as cathedral of the city. During the 10th-century, the crypt was built. The belltower contains six bells in F#, hung for Veronese bellringing art

An inventory of 1750 noted the main altarpiece and the choir were decorated by Domenico Brusasorzi. The Tribune was frescoed by Bernardo Muttoni. Some figure above the main altar were painted by Santo Prunati; however the ceiling and the cupola frescoes were mainly by Brusasorzi. He also painted an Adoration of the Magi for the first altar to right. The next altar on the right had a work by Giulio Carpioni the younger, a relative of Giulio Carpioni. The first altar on the left had a canvas depicting the Virgin and Child with Saints Peter and Andrew by Giovanni Francesco Carotto. To the sides of this altarpiece were paintings of Melchisidech and the Sacrifice of Isaac by Francesco Barbieri. The second altar had a Virgin and Child with Saints Jerome, Francis, Mauro, Simplicio, and Placido by Niccolo Giolfino. A frescoed lunette was competed by Giovanni Battista dal Moro. The Chapel of the Innocents had an altarpiece depicting the Massacre of Innocents by Pasquale Ottino and a Martyrdom of 40 martyrs by Alessandro Turchi (L'Orbetto). The chapel also had frescoes by Marcantonio Bassetti, and an Annuciation and frescoes of San Carlo and St Francis by Ottino.

In the last altar on left is a Virgin and Child with Saints Joseph, John the Baptist, Francis, and Anthony of Padua  by Alessandro Marchesini, and a Virgin and Child with Saints Vicenzo, Stefano, Anthony Abbot, and Francesco di Paola by Santo Prunati. Next to that altar was a Holy Spirit descends among the Apostles by Orazio Farinati.

The crypt has frescoes by Giulio Carpioni younger (Visitation and Repose in Egypt); Paolo Cimengoli (Annunciation); and Santo Prunati (Nativity), it held a copy of Raphael.

References

Stefano
Romanesque architecture in Verona
Stefano